Ludwig Graf (29 December 1868 – 17 November 1932) was an Austrian painter. His work was part of the painting event in the art competition at the 1928 Summer Olympics.

References

1868 births
1932 deaths
20th-century Austrian painters
Austrian male painters
Olympic competitors in art competitions
Artists from Vienna
20th-century Austrian male artists